Choijiljavyn "Choi" Tseveenpürev (born 6 October 1971 in Ulan Bator, Mongolia) is a Mongolian featherweight boxer based in the United Kingdom. Tseveenpurev won the Prizefighter series Featherweights tournament on 29 October 2011, the same month that he passed 40. This followed a ten-round victory on 18 June 2011 over former IBO featherweight champion Jackson Asiku – a fight nominated for the British boxing fight of the year.

Career
Tseveenpurev, known as the Mongol Warrior,  began his career with ten-rounders as an away fighter in South Korea and Thailand fighting legendary former and future world champion Veeraphol Sahaprom in only his third contest. This is one of only 7 defeats, all by points verdicts.

His boxing career saw him travel to Finland, Russia, South Korea, Thailand, Indonesia and China before settling in the UK in 2000. Tseveenpurev is currently trained by promoter Spencer Fearon, having previously worked with Jack Doughty and Lee Wilkins.

On 6 June 2008, he was awarded with the title of 'State Honoured Athlete' by the Mongolian President, Nambaryn Enkhbayar.

He won the vacant World Boxing Foundation (WBFo) title by knocking out David Kiilu in the third round. Tseveenpurev defended the title twice  before becoming the WBU Featherweight champion with a destructive win over Derry Mathews in Bolton on  5 April 2008,.

During the bout, Tseveenpurev was described as "Britain's answer to Manny Pacquiao" by boxing commentator John Rawling. With his unrelenting style and similar trademark ponytail, Choi has also been compared to Hall of Fame boxer Kostya Tszyu. Tseveenpurev himself lists Tszyu as his idol, along with Roberto Durán.

There followed a 15-month period of inactivity described as "criminal" by UK publication Boxing News which led him to briefly to retire, before returning to the ring with Spencer Fearon's Hard Knocks Boxing Promotions in June 2009.

In his first fight under the Hard Knocks banner, Tseveenpurev beat Lubos Prehradnik in three rounds on 11 July, his country's Independence Day in front of many of his countrymen who were earlier at London's Naadam celebrations. The crowd was described by boxing pundit Steve Bunce as the most passionate in British boxing for 30 years.

As of March 23, 2012, he holds the WBC International Silver Title belt, after knocking out Bastien Rozeaux in the eighth round, to claim the vacant WBC Silver Featherweight title

In May 2012 Daud Yordan claimed the IBO Featherweight World Championship title. Tseveenpurev lost  by a decision to Yordan in a championship fight on November 9, 2012, in a decision.

References

External links
 

1971 births
Living people
Sportspeople from Ulaanbaatar
Prizefighter contestants
Mongolian emigrants to the United Kingdom
Mongolian male boxers
Featherweight boxers
21st-century Mongolian people
20th-century Mongolian people